Jesse H. Settlemier House is a historic house in Woodburn, Oregon, United States. It was built by Jesse H. Settlemier, founder of Woodburn, in 1892. The house is no longer inhabited but is open to the public as a museum and as a location for special events such as weddings. The house is listed on the National Register of Historic Places.

See also
 National Register of Historic Places listings in Marion County, Oregon

References

External links
 Settlemier House (official website)

Woodburn, Oregon
Historic house museums in Oregon
Museums in Marion County, Oregon
National Register of Historic Places in Marion County, Oregon
Houses on the National Register of Historic Places in Oregon
1889 establishments in Oregon
Houses in Marion County, Oregon